Donald Elroy Boll (July 16, 1927 – December 29, 2001) was an American football offensive lineman in the National Football League for the Washington Redskins and the New York Giants.  He played college football at the University of Nebraska and was drafted in the fourth round of the 1953 NFL Draft.

1927 births
2001 deaths
American football offensive guards
American football offensive tackles
Nebraska Cornhuskers football players
Sportspeople from Nebraska
New York Giants players
Washington Redskins players
People from Scribner, Nebraska